Denmoza is a genus of cactus found in Argentina, comprising only 2 species. The name of the genus is an anagram of the western province of Mendoza. These species grow slowly and stay globulous during a long period before becoming shortly column-shaped, 0.5 to 1.5 m high. The plant's diameter varies from 15 to 30 cm.

Trunk color varies from pale green to dark green, dotted with 15 to 30 ribs. Flowers are zygomorphic, of a maximum length of 7.5 cm, reddish in color and have white hair on the tube. The flower open sufficiently widely so that the stigma and stamen are visible from outside. The fruit is spherical, of about 2.5 cm in diameter, and pale green. They are sometimes also reddish and split at maturity.

Due to the Denmoza's long spines and column shape, it is a good candidate to create an amplified cactus.

Species

External links
Cacti Guide.com: Denmoza

Trichocereeae
Cacti of South America
Endemic flora of Argentina
Mendoza Province
Cactoideae genera